is a Japanese football player. He plays for Vanraure Hachinohe.

Playing career
Koya Tanio joined to Kawasaki Frontale in 2011. In August 2013, he moved to Gainare Tottori. In July 2014, he moved to Vonds Ichihara. From 2015, he played for Matsue City FC (2015), Saurcos Fukui (2016-).

Club statistics
Updated to 5 April 2020.

References

External links
Profile at Vanraure Hachinohe

1992 births
Living people
Association football people from Tottori Prefecture
Japanese footballers
J1 League players
J2 League players
Japan Football League players
J3 League players
Kawasaki Frontale players
Gainare Tottori players
Vonds Ichihara players
Vanraure Hachinohe players
Association football forwards